Vacuolar protein sorting-associated protein 26A is a protein that in humans is encoded by the VPS26A gene.

This gene belongs to a group of vacuolar protein sorting (VPS) genes. The encoded protein is a component of a large multimeric complex, termed the retromer complex, involved in retrograde transport of proteins from endosomes to the trans-Golgi network. The close structural similarity between the yeast and human proteins that make up this complex suggests a similarity in function. Expression studies in yeast and mammalian cells indicate that this protein interacts directly with VPS35, which serves as the core of the retromer complex. Alternative splicing results in multiple transcript variants encoding different isoforms.

Structure 

Vps26 is a 38-kDa subunit that has a two-lobed structure with a polar core that resembles the arrestin family of trafficking adaptor. This fold consist of two related β-sandwich subdomains with a fibronectin type III domain topology. The two domains are joined together by a flexible linker and are closely associated by an unusual polar core.  Arrestins are regulatory proteins known for connecting G-protein coupled receptors (GPCRs) to clathrin during endocytosis. They play many critical roles in cell signalling and membrane trafficking. Both Vps26 and arrestins are composed of two structurally related β-sheet domains forming extensive interfaces with each other, using polar and electrostatic contacts to create interdomain interactions for ligand binding. However, there are significant structural differences between both Vps26 and arrestins. Vps26 protein has extended C-terminal tails that do not contain identifiable clathrin- or AP2-binding sequences, and therefore cannot form stable intramolecular contacts with clathrin and AP2, which has been observed for arrestins. Moreover, Vps26 does not have similar sequences as arrestins for GPCR and phospholipid interactions.

Vps26B paralogue 

In yeast, there is only one Vps26 species, whereas there are two Vps26 paralogues (Vps26A and Vps26B) in mammals.

X-ray crystallography revealed that the structures of both Vps26A and Vps26B share a similar bilobal β-sandwich structure and possess 70% sequence homology. However, these two paralogues distinctly differ on the surface patch within the N-terminal domain, the apex region where the N-terminal and C-terminal domains meet and the disordered C-terminal tail. Vps26B contains several putative serine phosphorylation residues within this disordered tail, which may represent a potential mechanism to modulate the difference between Vps26A and Vps26B. A recent study conducted by Bugarcic et al. pinpointed that this disordered tail on C-terminal region of Vps26B is one of the underlying factors that contributes to the failure for Vps26B-containing Retromer to associate with CI-M6PR, ultimately leading to CI-M6PR degradation, accompanied with increased cathepsin D secretion.

References

Further reading